is the governor of Gifu Prefecture in Japan, first elected in 2005 and reelected in 2009. A native of Gifu, Gifu, he was chosen as the final torchbearer for the National Sports Festival when it was held in Gifu while he was a senior at Gifu Prefectural Senior High School. He entered the Faculty of Law at the University of Tokyo and joined the Ministry of International Trade and Industry (MITI) in 1971.

Career in National Government 
During his time at MITI, he was sent to study at the École nationale d'administration in France. From 1994 to 1996, he served as the Executive Secretary to both Prime Ministers Tsutomu Hata and Tomiichi Murayama. Soon after he was appointed Director-General of the Economic Cooperation Department in the International Trade Bureau of MITI and later the Director-General for Commerce and Distribution Policy in the same ministry. In 2002, he was moved to the Ministry of Foreign Affairs to head the Economic Cooperation Bureau after the move was requested by then Foreign Minister Yoriko Kawaguchi and the Office of the Prime Minister. He was put in charge of various reform efforts within the ministry and was chiefly responsible for the Foreign Ministry updating and reforming Official Development Assistance (ODA). He left the ministry after he was elected in February 2005 to be the next governor of Gifu Prefecture, replacing Governor Taku Kajiwara, who had served for 16 years as governor.

2009 Election 
With the support of both major political parties, the DPJ and LDP, as well as the New Komeito Party, Hajime defeated newcomer Kazuhiko Kinoshita on January 25, 2009. Kinoshita, the head of a local labor consultation center, was supported by the Japanese Communist Party.

References

External links 
  

1947 births
Living people
People from Gifu
University of Tokyo alumni
Recipients of the Legion of Honour
École nationale d'administration alumni
Governors of Gifu Prefecture

Politicians from Gifu Prefecture